Two Girls Reading (French: Deux Enfants Lisant) is a 1934 painting by Pablo Picasso. Since 1994, it has been at the University of Michigan Museum of Art.

In 2002, UMMA included it in an exhibition called Picasso: Masterworks of the Collection.

Subject matter 
The figure on the left is thought to be Marie-Thérèse Walter, the twenty-three-year-old woman who gave birth to Picasso's daughter Maïa in 1935. The figure on the right is thought to be either Walter's sister, or Picasso's first wife Olga Koklova.

The painting shows Picasso's "fascination with the subject of women engaged in everyday activities and are united in their ability to convey intensity and peaceful contemplation simultaneously."

References

Paintings by Pablo Picasso
1934 paintings
Oil on canvas paintings
Portraits by Spanish artists
Cubist paintings
Portraits of women
Paintings in Michigan